Ahmed Rafiq al-Mahdawi ( 1898 - 1961) was a Libyan poet. Al-Mahdawi was born in 1898 in the village of Fassāṭo in Libya's Nafusa Mountains.

Early life
At the age of 13 he migrated to Egypt where he studied and achieved primary, secondary and baccalaureate.

Career
He returned to Libya and  worked there as a secretary of the Benghazi Council, but the Italian Fascists exiled him, fled to Turkey in 1934, and returned from exile in 1936. He returned to his home in 1946, and participated in the national movement which led to the independence of Libya on 24 December 1952, when he was appointed a member of the Senate. Major events in Libya, Egypt, Palestine and Tunisia are covered in his poetry. The guru of Arab authors "Al-‘Aqqād" called him the leader of poetry renovation. He died in 1961 in Libya. His most famous poem is "To Italy", written after the defeat of the Axis countries in 1945.

References

1898 births
1961 deaths
Libyan poets
Libyan politicians
Libyan exiles
20th-century poets
20th-century Libyan poets
20th-century Libyan politicians